Hogcrawl Creek is a stream in the U.S. state of Georgia.

A "hog crawl" is an archaic term for a hog enclosure or corral.

References

Rivers of Georgia (U.S. state)
Rivers of Dooly County, Georgia
Rivers of Macon County, Georgia